Something Wicked This Way Comes is the first solo studio album by Australian singer Cheyne Coates after leaving Madison Avenue. It produced two singles, "I've Got Your Number" and "Taste You", released in Australia.

Track listing

References

2004 debut albums
Cheyne Coates albums